Magical Starsign, originally released in Japan as  is a role-playing video game for the Nintendo DS developed by Brownie Brown. It is the sequel to the Japan-exclusive Game Boy Advance title, Magical Vacation. It was released in Japan and the United States in 2006 and was released in Europe the next year. Nintendo Australia has said that it would not publish the game in Australia and New Zealand as it expected low sales of the game.

Gameplay
The player uses the Nintendo DS's touch screen for character control and interaction, while the top screen displays maps and other general information. The battle system is turn-based, and the position of the planets within the game affects the amount of damage wielded or received by each character. All characters in the game are associated with a specific planet, and their magic attack power is boosted when a character's planet is positioned favorably. Players can also boost their attack power by tapping their character when the circle of symbols has disappeared around them during a battle. This is known as a "Spell Strike", and a large flash of color (the same color assigned to the character's element) appears prior to the attack. The player may also tap their character right before they are hit with an attack to receive less damage. This is known as a "Reflex Guard" and puts the character into a guard stance and causes them to glow with blue light. However, some attacks cannot be guarded against in this way.

Astrolog
There are 7 different elements in the game (light, darkness, fire, water, wood, earth, and wind) which each correspond to a planet in the game's solar system. The Astrolog tracks the movement of these planets, which move clockwise around a central point as time passes within the game. The orbital velocity of each planet varies according to their size and location. Magic spells of certain elements are twice as effective while a planet is orbiting within the area assigned to its corresponding element. This bonus applies for both the player's magic spells and enemy spells. The light and dark elements are instead affected by solar activity: light magic is more powerful during the daytime, and dark magic is more powerful during the night (in-game time is viewable as an animated hourglass). A certain spell acquired later in the game allows the player to move the planets to an advantageous position; or potentially align the 5 planets in a straight line (as indicated in the Japanese version's subtitle), which causes far more damage than the standard elemental bonus. The planets may also happen to align without using the spell, but this causes damage to both the player and the enemy.

Multiplayer
Up to six players may connect locally (a game card is required for each player), taking their characters into a dungeon where they work together to defeat monsters while racing to collect treasure. Points are awarded for damage done to enemies and treasure collected from chests, and the player with the most points at the end wins the multiplayer mode. Experience points and treasures gained in this mode are applied to the main game.

Tag mode allows players to exchange game data to gain new items. Up to 100 players are recorded on the game's friend list, and the item gained will vary depending on in-game progress or the main character's element. There is also an option to create a short message displayed when tag mode is used, allowing players to exchange messages with each other. Using the tag mode frequently will create an "egg character", which becomes stronger each time tag mode is used successfully. The player can use the egg character in the main game, but it will not gain levels with experience like other characters.

Synopsis

Plot

The solar system of Magical Starsign consists of 6 planets: the planets of fire, wood, wind, water, earth, and another small planet on the fringes of the solar system called Kovomaka. Kovomaka houses the Will-O-Wisp academy of magic, where 6 aspiring magicians are studying in the same class under the guidance of their teacher, Miss Madeleine. One day, Principal Biscotti receives word that Master Kale, a graduate of the academy, has become the leader of the space pirates, and is planning to destroy the solar system. He sends Miss Madeleine out into space on a mission to prevent Master Kale from achieving his evil plans, but loses all contact with her shortly afterwards. 3 months later, Lassi, one of the current students in the academy, discovers a small spaceship hidden on the roof of the academy building, and goes off into space in search of Miss Madeleine. The hero of the story pursues Lassi in another spaceship, but is forced to crash land on another planet. The player must reunite with the other 5 classmates, rescue Miss Madeleine, and derail Master Kale's evil plans in a wild journey across outer-space.

Setting
The story takes place within the seven planets of the Baklava solar system. Transportation between planets is made possible by using a magical spaceship, and players may freely visit other planets as the story progresses. The planets also play an important role in the game's battle system.

The first planet, Kovomaka, is an obscure magic planet located on the fringe of the solar system, which houses the Will-O-Wisp academy of magic. It is not listed on Astrologs because of its small size and location, and the people living on the planet are unaware of the presence of other planets, as other planets are unaware of Kovomaka's existence for the same reason.

Erd ( in the Japanese version) is the earth planet, where the player makes a crash landing at the beginning of the game. The planet is covered with stone mountains and desert, and is mostly populated by ancient robots and spiny mole people. Ancient ruins are located all across the planet. The ancient Espresso people lived on this planet before becoming extinct by "gummification" to power the robot power cells. There were also nine Stone Giants who once roamed the planet, the last one being Tektos, who was killed in an attack against Magnus Muzzleflash and gave the Earth Millennium Gummy to the children as a parting gift.

Cassia is the water planet, which consists of two large islands.  The planet is mainly populated by otter people, and another magic academy, Ambergis Prep, established prior to Will-O-Wisp is located on Granule Island. Cassia is frozen cold when the player first arrives. The planet is home to the Aquarino, a water particle that neither freezes or evaporates as a side effect of being set on fire by the "Fire Otter". The planet is also home to the Holy Water Pyramid, home to the Water Millennium Gummy and the ancient race of water people.

Puffoon is the wind planet, where the headquarters of the Space Police are located. This was the player's intended destination prior to the crash-landing, and endless barren land stretches out beyond highly developed cities, leading to various odd areas such as the rabbit-populated town of Honey Mint White Caramel Fudgeflake with Melty Butter and Syrup and Whipped Cream on Top and the Couscous Ruins, a strange area home to the Wind Millennium Gummy where "time just piles up like snow".

Gren is the wood planet, which is mostly covered with jungle terrain. The planet is populated with Felin and Salamander people, and the space pirate base is also located here. The giant tree Yggsalad soars above the deepest parts of the jungle. The salamanders used to live in Yggsalad, but the pirates evicted them five years ago. The heroes obtained the Wood Millennium Gummy here, after a Felin named Semolina sacrificed herself to the anthropophagus, a man-eating flower within Yggsalad. The planet was at one point set on fire.

Razen is the fire planet, which cannot be entered by normal spaceships because of its extreme heat. Rivers of lava flow on the planet's surface, and the central mountain houses many dwarves. A stone stage deep in the cave called World's Seam acts as a portal to Nova. Another cave, called Capscium Caverns is home to a (nonexistent) dragon called Scargot and the Fire Millennium Gummy. Two different species live here, living pots and dwarves. Dragons used to live on the planets (as evidenced by skeletons in Capscium Caverns), but became extinct due to unknown reasons (a dwarf believes Scargot killed them all, suggesting that at one point Scargot was an actual dragon).

Nova is the light planet and one of two planets within the Baklava system's sun. It is populated by odd creatures called Dancing Fruit and the people of the light, the Luminites, whose queen dies and lives under mysterious circumstances. The Luminite palace holds a Starway to the other planet in the sun, Shadra. A dungeon called Glissini Caves lies hidden under the planet's surface, holding a powerful version of Shadra called Umbra.

Shadra is the dark planet and one of two planets within the sun. The mountainous planet is populated by enigmas, physical embodiments of darkness, varieties including Piskpooka, Dab Hasnel, and Equillekrew (all featured in Magical Vacation). A massive worm, Shadra, that is destined to eat the sun lives in massive caverns called Chromagar Caves, which turns any living thing that lingers there into a gummy to be eaten by Shadra.

Characters

Classmates
Hero/Heroine
The player can choose the main character's gender and element (light or darkness) at the start of the game. Unlike Magical Vacation, the main character's abilities are the same regardless of gender, but a special event occurs with Lassi when the main character is male, and with Mokka if the main character is female. The main character is considered the leader of the group, and holds the rest of the students in place. After the conclusion of the game, the main character lives with the dwarves on Erd before returning to space again after witnessing a special reaction in far away space.

Lassi
Lassi is a ditzy, mischievous rabbitmorph girl who wields the wind element. She joins the player on Erd, after going off into space on her own in search of Miss Madeleine. If the main character is male, there is an event where she reveals her love for the main character. She becomes a scientist after the conclusion of the game, and sends Mokka into outer space as a rocket.

Mokka
Mokka is a robot discovered in a novelty store by Principal Biscotti who became a student at the Will-O-Wisp academy after being fixed up. He specializes in earth magic, and takes a logical and deadpan view on everything. However, he has a strong desire to be in a romantic relationship, and has a crush on the main character if female. He joins the player on Cassia, and his presence as an ancient robot becomes important in the later parts of the story. He is shot off into space by Lassi after the conclusion of the story.

Chai
Chai is a salamandermorph who specializes in wood magic. Salamanders are usually unable to use magic, but Chai naturally gained magic abilities. He also speaks differently from other salamanders in the game, and is viewed as a freak by other salamanders. He knows an important secret concerning the game's story, and goes off into space with Mokka after the conclusion of the game. Chai joins the player on Puffoon, and he bears the same name in both the Japanese and English versions. He might have a little crush on Lassi, but it's hard to tell.

Pico
Pico is a hot-blooded young boy who specializes in fire magic. He has affection towards Sorbet, and often tries to show off to her. He is the most hardheaded of the classmates, and often attempts to take on a leadership role. He is tremendously bad at schoolwork, and after the conclusion of the game, he quits the magic academy after failing several grades to go off on voyages on his own.

Sorbet
Sorbet is the most serious and hardworking girl of the classmates. She specializes in water magic, and comes from a poor family that struggles to pay her tuition for the magic academy. She eventually finds out about Pico's affections and starts a bud of affection towards him. She leaves the school for financial reasons, but returns afterwards as an honors student and graduates to become a high-ranking officer in the Space Police.

Faculty
Miss Madeleine
The klutzy instructor of the magic academy is one of the only returning characters from the game's predecessor, and plays a large role in Magical Starsign. She is sent out to stop Master Kale by Principal Biscotti, but disappears shortly afterwards, causing her 6 students to worry and eventually embark on a long journey to find her. As the game progresses, it is revealed that she is a graduate of the magic academy in Cassia, and that she has lived for over 800 years, even though her appearance is still that of a young woman. Her magic element is always the opposite of the player's element (she uses dark magic if the main character bears the light element, and vice versa). According to Lassi, her strength as a magician even surpasses Principal Biscotti.

Principal Biscotti
The principal of the Will-O-Wisp academy is another returning character from the original game. Like Miss Madeleine, he is a graduate of the magic academy in Cassia, and it is rumored that he has learned the secret to immortality.

4 other characters from the previous game, Magical Vacation, are mentioned throughout the story but do not make actual appearances in the game.  is mentioned as a teacher at the Will-O-Wisp academy who is unpopular with students because of his strict teaching style.

Pirates of Cassia
The space pirates are a group of villains that have recently started to abduct magicians. Their main base is located on the wood planet, Gren, and most of them are otters who wield the water element. Low-ranking members tend to attack with swords, fishing rods, or ship anchors instead of magic.

Master Kale
The main villain of the game is an enigmatic wizard whose face is completely hidden, except for his left eye and a wave of blond hair. Master Kale controls both the Pirates of Cassia and the Space Police from behind the scenes, and is currently gathering magicians together for some unknown purpose. It is revealed that he was once a quiet but brilliant student in Miss Madeleine's class at the magic academy.

Master Chard
The leader of the space pirates is Master Kale's right-hand man, who wears a sea urchin mask to conceal his face. He uses dark magic and martial arts, and battles the player 3 times over the course of the game. He maintains his loyalty to Master Kale to the very end, where he dies in a final suicide attack after losing to the classmates for the third time at the entrance of the final cave.

Space Police
The space police base is located in the wind planet, Puffoon, and they are notorious for redirecting cases to other departments or ignoring them completely. They are secretly in league with the Pirates of Cassia, and generic police officers fight using light magic, bombs, and martial arts. They also have special shields made by the dwarves equipped on their backs, which allow them to fly.

Biek Fowler
This large chicken-type alien is the combat instructor of the Space Police, and is a minion of Master Kale. He wields dark magic, and is a master of martial arts as well. He is purported to be one of the best magic duelists in the entire universe, and was the one that captured Miss Madeleine at Puffoon. After being defeated by the classmates, he tries to kill everyone around him with a suicide attack, but is thwarted by an unexpected ally of the classmates.

Gil Mudflap
This Space Police officer wears a shell-shaped shield on his head, and his biggest weapon is his bad odor, which instantly causes those around him to faint. He also attacks by stomping, and calls Abalon Demar his brother. He faces the classmates at Razen, and it is unclear what his fate was after being defeated by them.

Abalon Demar
This Space Police officer rides on large shell-shaped shield, and faces the classmates on Cassia. He is shown wielding a sword at various points in the game, but does not use the weapon during battle. He has the ability to charm opponents, regardless of their species or gender, and is one of the few beings capable of withstanding Gil Mudflap's body odor. Like Gil Mudflap, his fate after being defeated by the classmates remains unclear.

Brie Pourri
This high-ranking female officer wields a heart-shaped shield and sword. During the first part of the game, she is the one who captures Chai, who had managed to steal secret files from the police base. However, her true intention is to improve the sorry state of the Space Police force, and assists the classmates after being reunited with her father, former Space Police general Knucklestorm.

Magnus Muzzleflash
Muzzleflash is notorious even among the Space Police for his violent tendencies, and was suspended from the force because of his immense cruelty towards all others. He is brought back into the force by Abalon Demar, and faces the classmates on top of the Stone Giant on Erd. He has two large cannons mounted on his shield, but prefers to test his strength by brawling. The Stone Giant kills Muzzleflash with a massive energy beam after the conclusion of the battle.

Detective Beignet
The heroes first encounter this officer on a frozen Cassia, but is revealed later in the game to be the only officer in the Police to try and aid the children. He is considered a traitor to the Space Police by high-ranking officials in the Police for this. The female otters on Cassia adore him.

Lt. Mugwort
Mugwort is a green, purple-haired alien that carries a star-shaped shield. On Puffoon, he temporarily arrested Chai. His in-game description mentions that he took the job as being Demar's lackey so he could massage Demar's shoulders.

Localization
Like many Japanese games released in other countries, most of the character names and place names of Magical Starsign underwent changes during localization. Characters are named after foods or drinks in both the Japanese and English versions, and each species has its own theme of food for their names. For instance, the mole people encountered on Erd are all named after various cheeses (Bleu, Munster, Cheddar), while dwarves are named after sauces, dressings, and other condiments.

Reception

Magical Starsign received "average" reviews according to the review aggregation website Metacritic. In Japan, Famitsu gave it a score of three eights and one seven, while Famitsu DS + Cube & Advance gave it all four eights.

Eurogamer said that it was "something which is well worth a look for any RPG fan who's in the market for a handheld adventure". GameRevolution called Magical Starsign a "solid old-school RPG" with good localization and audiovisuals, but disliked the limited number of spells, lack of innovative gameplay, and the overuse of stylus controls. GameSpot praised the humorous, wholesome script with a diverse cast of characters but thought the bland storyline, basic battle system, and high random encounter rate held the game back. Pocket Gamer similarly acknowledged the game's issues.

Notes

References

External links
 Magical Starsign official website 
 Official website 
 Interview with the developers at RPGamer.com
 

2006 video games
Brownie Brown games
Nintendo games
Nintendo DS games
Nintendo DS-only games
Role-playing video games
Science fiction video games
Video game sequels
Video games developed in Japan
Video games featuring protagonists of selectable gender
Video games produced by Kensuke Tanabe
Video games scored by Tsukasa Masuko
Video games set on fictional planets